Justinian Heathcote Edwards-Heathcote (1843 – 21 January 1928) was a British Army officer and politician.

Edwards-Heathcote was eldest son of Rev. Edward James Justinian Edwards and his wife, the former Elizabeth Anne Heathcote, daughter of British politician Richard Edensor Heathcote. Born in Trentham, Staffordshire, where his father was the vicar, Edwards-Heathcote was educated at Winchester College before receiving a commission in the 63rd (West Suffolk) Regiment of Foot.  From 1875, he served as a captain in the Staffordshire Yeomanry.

He stood unsuccessfully for the Conservative Party in North West Staffordshire at the 1885 UK general election, but won the seat in 1886.  He retired in 1892.

References

1843 births
1928 deaths
Conservative Party (UK) MPs for English constituencies
People educated at Winchester College
People from Trentham, Staffordshire
Politicians from Staffordshire
Staffordshire Yeomanry officers
UK MPs 1886–1892